A subsidiary alliance, in South Asian history, was a tributary alliance between an Indian state and a European East India Company. 

Under this system, an Indian ruler who formed a treaty with the company in question would be provided with protection against any external attacks. In return, the ruler was required to: 
 keep the company's army at the capital of their state, 
 give either money or territory to the company for the maintenance of the troops,
 expel all other Europeans from their state, whether they were employed in the army or in the civil service, 
 keep a European official called 'resident' at the capital of their state who would oversee all negotiations and communications with other states, meaning that the ruler was to have no direct correspondence or relations with other states, without the resident's approval. 
The ruler was also forbidden from maintaining an Indian Administrative Service.
It was introduced by Lord Wellesley

Development
The system of subsidiary alliances was pioneered by the French East India Company governor Joseph François Dupleix, who in the late 1740s established treaties with the Nizam of Hyderabad, India, and other Indian princes in the Carnatic region. The system was subsequently adopted by the British East India Company, with Robert Clive negotiating a series of conditions with Mir Jafar following his victory in the 1757 Battle of Plassey, and subsequently those in the 1765 Treaty of Allahabad, as a result of the company's success in the 1764 Battle of Buxar. A successor of Clive, Richard Wellesley initially took a non-interventionist policy towards the various Indian states which were allied to the British East India Company, but later adopted, and refined the policy of forming subsidiary alliances. The purpose and ambition of this change are stated in his February 1804 dispatch to the East India Company Resident in Hyderabad:

"His Excellency the Governor-General's policy in establishing subsidiary alliances with the principal states of India is to place those states in such a degree of dependence on the British power as may deprive them of the means of prosecuting any measures or of forming any confederacy hazardous to the security of the British empire, and may enable us to reserve the tranquility of India by exercising a general control over those states, calculated to prevent the operation of that restless spirit of ambition and violence which is the characteristic of every Asiatic government, and which from the earliest period of Eastern history has rendered the peninsula of India the scene of perpetual warfare, turbulence and disorder..."  Richard Wellesley, 4th February 1804

By the late 18th century, the power of the Maratha Empire had weakened and the Indian subcontinent was left with a great number of states, most small and weak. Many rulers accepted the offer of protection by Wellesley, as it gave them security against attack by their neighbors.

Adoption
The kingdom of Awadh was the first to enter an alliance like this through Treaty of Allahabad (1765), after its defeat in Battle of Buxar (1764). Though annexation of Awadh was done on the basis of maladministration and hence is not counted under the subsidiary alliances. Tipu Sultan of the Kingdom of Mysore refrained from doing so, but after the British victory in the Fourth Anglo-Mysore War in 1799, Mysore became a subsidiary state before coming under Company rule.

The Nizam of Hyderabad was the first to accept a well-framed subsidiary alliance in 1798. After the Third Anglo-Maratha War (1817–19), Maratha ruler Baji Rao II also accepted a subsidiary alliance.

Other states also accepted this alliance, including Tanjore/Mysore (1799), Awadh (1801), Peshwa (1802), Bhonsle (1803), Scindia (1804), Singrauli (1814), Jaipur Jodhpur(1818)
.

The Holkar State of Indore was the last Maratha confederation member to accept the Subsidiary Alliance in 1818.

Advantages for the British 

 The British acquired valuable territories as subsidiary payment.
 The Indian rulers maintained large armies for the British.
 The British indirectly controlled the defence and foreign affairs of the protected ally.
 They could also overthrow the Indian ruler and annex their territories whenever they wished to.
 Other European powers had little access to the courts of the Indian rulers and could not influence them.

Disadvantages for the Indian rulers 
 Indian rulers lost their independence and were completely controlled by the British.

See also 
 Salute state
 Tributary state
 British protectorate
 Rajputana Agency
 Client state
 Indirect rule

References

Further reading
 George Bruce Malleson: An Historical Sketch of the Native States of India in Subsidiary Alliance with the British Government, Longmans, Green, and co., 1875, .
 Edward Ingram: Empire-Building and Empire-Builders: twelve studies, Routledge, 1995, .

British East India Company
British Empire
Military alliances
Princely states of India
Treaties by type
Treaties of the British East India Company